

Plants of the World Online list
The following species in the genus Prunus are recognised by Plants of the World Online:

POWO A-C

P. africana 
P. aitchisonii 
P. alaica 
P. albicaulis 
P. americana 
P. amplifolia 
P. amygdalus 
P. andersonii 
P. angustifolia 
P. annularis 
P. antioquensis 
P. apetala 
P. aquifolioides 
P. arabica 
P. arborea 
P. argentea 
P. armeniaca 
P. austrosinensis 
P. avium 
P. axitliana 
P. balansae 
P. barbata 
P. beccarii 
P. bifrons 
P. bokhariensis 
P. brachybotrya 
P. brachypetala 
P. brachypoda 
P. brachystachya 
P. bracteopadus 
P. brahuica 
P. brasiliensis 
P. brassii 
P. brigantina 
P. brittoniana 
P. browiczii 
P. brunnescens 
P. bucharica 
P. buergeriana 
P. buxifolia 
P. campanulata 
P. canescens 
P. carduchorum 
P. caroliniana 
P. caudata 
P. ceraseidos 
P. cerasia 
P. cerasifera 
P. cerasoides 
P. cerasus 
P. cercocarpifolia 
P. ceylanica 
P. chamissoana 
P. changyangensis 
P. chiapensis 
P. choreiana 
P. chorossanica 
P. clarofolia 
P. clementis 
P. cocomilia 
P. compacta 
P. conadenia 
P. conradinae 
P. consociiflora 
P. cornuta 
P. cortapico 
P. costata 
P. crassifolia 
P. crataegifolia 
P. cyclamina

POWO  D-F

P. darvasica 
P. davidiana 
P. dawyckensis 
P. debilis 
P. densa 
P. detrita 
P. dictyoneura 
P. discadenia 
P. discoidea 
P. discolor 
P. dolichadenia 
P. dolichobotrys 
P. domestica 
P. douglasii 
P. eburnea 
P. elaeagrifolia  (orth. var. P. elaeagnifolia)
P. emarginata 
P. eremophila 
P. erythrocarpa 
P. erythroxylon 
P. falcata 
P. fasciculata 
P. fenzliana 
P. ferruginea 
P. fordiana 
P. fragrans 
P. fremontii 
P. fruticosa 
P. fujianensis

POWO  G-I

P. gazelle-peninsulae 
P. geniculata 
P. gentryi 
P. georgica 
P. glabrifolia 
P. glandulosa 
P. glauca 
P. glauciphylla 
P. gracilis 
P. grayana 
P. griffithii  
P. grisea 
P. guanaiensis 
P. guatemalensis 
P. gyirongensis 
P. hargraonensis 
P. haussknechtii 
P. havardii 
P. henryi 
P. herthae 
P. himalaica 
P. himalayana 
P. hirtipes 
P. hortulana  
P. huantensis 
P. humilis 
P. hypoleuca 
P. hypotricha 
P. hypotrichodes 
P. hypoxantha 
P. ilicifolia 
P. incana 
P. incisa 
P. incisoserrata 
P. insititia 
P. integrifolia 
P. itosakura

POWO  J-L

P. jacquemontii 
P. jajarkotensis 
P. jamasakura 
P. japonica 
P. javanica 
P. jenkinsii 
P. jugata 
P. kaengkrachanensis 
P. kansuensis 
P. 
P. koelzii 
P. korshinskyi 
P. kotschyi 
P.kuramica kuramica 
P. kurdica 
P. lamponga 
P. lancilimba 
P. laurocerasus 
P. laxiflora 
P. laxinervis 
P. ledebouriana 
Prunus leiocarpa  -synonym of P. elaeagrifolia
P. leucophylla 
P. leveilleana 
P. ligustrina 
P. litigiosa 
P. littlei 
P. lundelliana 
P. lusitanica 
P. lycioides 
P. lyonii

POWO  M-O

P. maackii 
P. macradenia 
P. mahaleb 
P. malayana 
P. mandshurica 
P. maritima 
P. marsupialis 
P. matudae 
P. maximowiczii 
P. megacarpa 
P. menghaiensis 
P. mexicana 
P. microcarpa 
P. microphylla 
P. minutiflora 
P. mira 
P. moldavica 
P. mongolica 
P. monticola 
P. moritziana 
P. mugus 
P. mume 
P. munsoniana 
P. muris 
P. murrayana 
P. myrtifolia 
P. nairica 
P. napaulensis 
P. nigra 
P. nipponica 
P. oblonga 
P. obtusata 
P. occidentalis 
P. ocellata 
P. ochoterenae 
P. oleifolia 
P. oligantha 
P. omissa 
P. oocarpa 
P. opaca 
P. orientalis 
P. ovalis

POWO  P-R

P. pabotii 
P. padus 
P. patentipila 
P. pearcei 
P. pedunculata 
P. pensylvanica 
P. persica 
P. perulata 
P. petunnikowii 
P. phaeosticta 
P. pilosiuscula 
P. pleiantha 
P. pleiocerasus 
P. podperae 
P. pogonostyla 
P. polystachya 
P. polytricha 
P. prostrata 
P. pseudocerasus 
P. pseudoprostrata 
P. pulgarensis 
P. pullei 
P. pumila 
P. pusilliflora 
P. pygeoides 
P. ramburii 
P. ramonensis 
P. ravenii 
P. rechingeri 
P. reflexa 
P. reverchonii 
P. rhamnoides 
P. rigida 
P. rivularis 
P. rotunda 
P. rubiginosa 
P. rufa 
P. rufoides 
P. ruiziana 
P. runemarkii

POWO  S-U

P. salasii 
P. salicina 
P. samydoides 
P. sargentii 
P. schlechteri 
P. schneideriana 
P. sclerophylla 
P. scoparia 
P. sericea 
P. serotina 
P. serrula 
P. serrulata 
P. setulosa 
P. shikokuensis 
P. sibirica 
P. simonii 
P. spartioides 
P. speciosa 
P. spicata 
P. spinosa 
P. spinosissima 
P. spinulosa 
P. ssiori 
P. stellipila 
P. stepposa 
P. stipulacea 
P. stipulata 
P. strobilifera 
P. subcordata 
P. subcorymbosa 
P. subglabra 
P. susakensis 
P. susquehanae 
P. szechuanica 
P. tadzhikistanica 
P. takesimensis 
P. tangutica 
P. taplejungnica 
P. tartarea 
P. tatsienensis 
P. tenella 
P. tetradenia 
P. texana 
P. tomentosa 
P. topkegolensis 
P. tortuosa 
P. trichamygdalus 
P. trichantha 
P. trichostoma 
P. triloba 
P. tuberculata 
P. tucumanensis 
P. turcomanica 
P. turfosa 
P. turneriana 
P. ulei 
P. ulmifolia 
P. umbellata 
P. undulata 
P. urartu 
P. urotaenia 
P. urumiensis

POWO V-Z

P. vachuschtii 
P. vaniotii 
P. veitchii 
P. velutina 
P. verrucosa 
P. versteeghii 
P. virginiana 
P. walkeri 
P. wallaceana 
P. wattii 
P. webbii 
P. wendelboi 
P. wilsonii 
P. yunnanensis 
P. zabulica 
P. zinggii 
P. zippeliana

POWO hybrids

Prunus × chichibuensis 
Prunus × compta 
Prunus × dasycarpa 
Prunus × eminens 
Prunus × ferganica 
Prunus × furuseana 
Prunus × fruticans 
Prunus × gondouinii 
Prunus × hisauchiana 
Prunus × insueta 
Prunus × iranshahrii 
Prunus × javorkae 
Prunus × kamiaranensis 
Prunus × keredjensis 
Prunus × kubotana 
Prunus × lannesiana 
Prunus × mitsuminensis 
Prunus × miyasakana 
Prunus × mohacsyana 
Prunus × mozaffarianii 
Prunus × nudiflora 
Prunus × oneyamensis 
Prunus × orthosepala 
Prunus × palmeri 
Prunus × parvifolia 
Prunus × sacra 
Prunus × saviczii 
Prunus × sefinensis 
Prunus × sieboldii 
Prunus × simmleri 
Prunus × slavinii 
Prunus × stacei 
Prunus × subhirtella 
Prunus × syodoi 
Prunus × syriaca 
Prunus × tschonoskii 
Prunus × uzbekistanica 
Prunus × vavilovii 
Prunus × yasujensis 
Prunus × yedoensis 
Prunus × yuyamae

The Plant List
The following additional species in the genus Prunus are still recognised by The Plant List:

The Plant List species  
P. adenopoda
P. alabamensis
P. alleghaniensis
P. amygdaloides
P. besseyi
P. carmesina
P. concinna
P. dielsiana
P. dulcis
P. ferganensis
P. glomerata
P. hainanensis
P. hippophaeoides
P. ishidoyana
P. koraiensis
P. kurilensis
P. mirabilis
P. nachichevanica
P. sachalinensis
P. salicifolia
P. sieboldii
P. sogdiana
P. spachiana - synonym of P. itosakura
P. subhirtella
P. ussuriensis
P. venosa
P. virens
P. wallichii

The Plant List hybrids
Prunus × cistena
Prunus × juddii
Prunus × shikokuensis

ITIS list
The following additional species are accepted by the Integrated Taxonomic Information System (ITIS), although they might be considered synonyms by other sources:

Prunus pleuradenia
Prunus × pugetensis 
Prunus × utahensis

GRIN list
The following additional species are accepted by the Germplasm Resources Information Network (GRIN), although they might be considered synonyms by other sources, or be erroneous accessions:

GRIN species
Prunus erioclada
Prunus ferganica
Prunus glandulifolia
Prunus graeca
Prunus meyeri
Prunus pojarkovii
Prunus takasagomontana
Prunus ursina
Prunus verecunda

GRIN hybrids

Prunus × arnoldiana
Prunus × balansae
Prunus × blireiana
Prunus × dawyckensis
Prunus × fontanesiana
Prunus × incam
Prunus × kanzakura
Prunus × knudsonii
Prunus × persicoides
Prunus × rossica
Prunus × schmittii

Tropicos list
The following additional species are listed by Tropicos; many are synonyms of the species above:

Tropicos A-C

P. accumulans
P. acuminata  - synonym of P. maritima
P. acutissima
P. adenodonta
P. ampla
P. anomala
P. ansu
P. apodantha
P. aridus
P. arkansana
P. aspera
P. australis
P. balfourii
P. batalinii
P. betancurii
P. bicolor
P. biloba
P. bonatii
P. botan
P. brevistylina
P. brigantiaca
P. bruijnii
P. canadensis
P. capellin
P. capollin
P. capuli
P. carcharias
P. carolinae – synonym of P. subcorymbosa
P. caspica
P. cellonvii
P. chamaecerasus
P. chicasa
P. chikusiensis
P. cinerascens
P. communis
P. cornifolia
P. corymbulosa
P. crataegifolius
P. crenulata
P. cuneata
P. cuthbertii

Tropicos D-F

P. dasycarpa
P. dehiscens
P. demissa
P. depressa
P. divaricata
P. donarium
P. droseracea
P. duclouxii
P. dunniana
P. dussii
P. edentata
P. eriogyna
P. ernestii
P. espinozana
P. eximia
P. floribunda
P. formosana
P. fortunensis
P. fukudana
P. fultonensis
P. furuseana

Tropicos G-I

P. ganman-zakura
P. giraldiana
P. glabra
P. glyptocarya
P. gongshanensis
P. gracilifolia
P. gravesii  - synonym of P. maritima
P. gymnodonta
P. helenae
P. herincquiana
P. hiemalis
P. hintonii
P. hirsuta
P. hirtifolia
P. hisauchiana
P. hosseusii
P. icaco
P. ichangana
P. ignotus
P. imanishii
P. injucunda
P. introrsa
P. involucrata

Tropicos J-L

P. kanehirai
P. kanzakura
P. kawakamii
P. kerii
P. kinkiensis
P. kobuku-zakura
P. kolomikta
P. koshiensis
P. lanata
P. lannesiana
P. latidentata
P. laurifolia
P. lichoana
P. limbata
P. lobulata

Tropicos M-O

P. macgregoriana
P. macrophylla
P. mairei
P. majestica
P. malifolia
P. marginata
P. martabanica
P. matuurae
P. melanocarpa
P. microbotrys
P. microlepis, synonym of P. itosakura
P. micromeloides
P. mitis
P. mochidzukiana
P. mohacsyana
P. mollis
P. moniwana
P. multipunctata
P. mutabilis
P. nakaii
P. nana
P. neglecta
P. nepalensis
P. nitens
P. nitida
P. novoleontis
P. nubium
P. odontocalyx
P. oeconomica
P. ohwii
P. oregana
P. oxycarpa
P. oxyodonta
P. oxyphylla

Tropicos P-R

P. padifolia
P. palmeri
P. paniculata
P. paniculatus
P. paracerasus
P. parksii
P. pauciflora
P. pendula
P. petzoldii
P. phyllopoda
P. pilosa
P. pinetorum
P. pissardii
P. platysepala
P. pleifolia
P. pleuroptera
P. plurinervis
P. podadenia
P. polyandra
P. potosina
P. prionophylla
P. prunella
P. prunifolia
P. pseudo-prostrata
P. psilliflora
P. pubescens  - synonym of P. maritima
P. pubigera
P. puddum
P. pulchella
P. pumilus
P. punctata
P. pyramidalis
P. quelpaertensis
P. racemosa
P. recurviflora
P. rehderiana
P. reticulata
P. robustus
P. rossiana
P. rufomicans
P. rufula
P. rugosa
P. rupestris

Tropicos S-U

P. sacra
P. sakabai
P. saltuum
P. sana
P. sapidus
P. sativa
P. schiedeana
P. schultzeae
P. scopulorum
P. sellowii
P. semiarmillata
P. semperflorens
P. shirataki
P. siltepecana
P. sinensis
P. skutchii
P. sphaerocarpa
P. sprengeri
P. staminata
P. steyermarkii
P. stocksiana
P. subcoriacea
P. sundaica
P. syodoi
P. taiwaniana, synonym of P. itosakura
P. tajimensis
P. takasawana
P. takenakae
P. tama-clivorum
P. tarda
P. tenuiflora
P. tenuifolia
P. texensis
P. thibetica
P. tikalana
P. tiliifolia
P. tobagenzoana
P. totan
P. transarisanensis
P. trichocarpa
P. trichopetala
P. triflora
P. trilobus
P. tschonoskii
P. twymaniana
P. urticaefolius
P. utahensis

Tropicos V-Z

P. valida
P. vana
P. venulosa
P. venusta
P. vulgaris
P. watsonii
P. wildeniana
P. williamsii
P. wurdackii
P. xerocarpa
P. yedoensis
P. zappeyana

Tropicos hybrids
Prunus × bukosanensis
Prunus × domestica
Prunus × takasawana

GBIF list
The following additional species are accepted by the Global Biodiversity Information Facility (GBIF):

GBIF A-C

P. acutangulata
P. acutantulata
P. andarobi
P. azorica
P. baccarii
P. badilloi
P. boissieri
P. bullata
P. caloneura
P. chichibuensis
P. cochinchinensis
P. compta

GBIF D-F

P. diamentina
P. dolichophylla
P. eminens
P. erzincanica
P. foveata
P. fructicosa
P. fruticans

GBIF G-I

P. gideonii 
P. gondouinii 
P. guianensis 
P. harae 
P. hendersonii 
P. hixa 
P. insueta 
P. irvingi

GBIF J-L

P. jalcata
P. javorkae
P. juddii
P. kalkmanii
P. kalmykovii
P. kamiaranensis
P. keredjensis
P. kingdonwardii
P. korschinskii
P. kubotana
P. kurdistanica
P. lindleyi

GBIF M-O

P. media
P. mitsuminensis
P. miyasakana
P. miyoshii
P. mochizukiana
P. mozaffarianii
P. myriocephala
P. nikaii
P. nota
P. odorata
P. oneyamensis
P. orazii

GBIF P-R

P. peritula
P. pilioscula
P. pittieri
P. pseudoaffinis
P. pugetensis  -synonym of Prunus × pugetensis

GBIF S-U

P. saviczii
P. schlecteri
P. sefinensis
P. singalilaensis
P. slavinii
P. solisii
P. stacei
P. tatsiensis
P. uzbekistanica

GBIF V-Z

P. vavilovii
P. xingshanensis
P. yaoiana
P. yasujensis
P. yuyamae
P. zingii

GBIF hybrids
Prunus × rhodia

Others

Species
 
P. apiculatus
P. arbascensis
P. arduennensis
P. boldus
P. claviculata
P. delipavlovii
P. dementis
P. erectus
P. flavescens
P. ghahremanii
P. hallasanensis
P. hefengensis
P. laoshanensis
P. longispinosa
P. jingningensis
P. junghuhnianus
P. kumanoensis
P. maingayi
P. matuurai
P. mespilifolia
P. morioka-pendula
P. nutantiflora
P. pananensis
P. paradoxa
P. reuteri
P. rubicundus
P. sunhangii
P. tianshanica
P. wangii
P. xueluoensis
P. yazdiana
P. zhengheensis

Hybrids
Prunus × armestica
Prunus × cerea
Prunus × limeixing
Prunus persica × Prunus americana

Fossil species
Species described from isolated fossil foliage, fruits, or wood. Some may have been synonymized with other fossil Prunus species, other fossil genera, or even living species at some point after their description.

Fossil A-C

P.? acutifolia  (Turonian, Raritan Formation, USA)
P. aegaea  (Early Miocene, Europe-Greenland)
P. allenbyensis  (Ypresian, Allenby Formation, Canada)
P. angustiserrata  (Middle Pliocene, Europe)
P.? antecedens  (Cretaceous?, Kansas, USA)
P. antiqua  (Oligocene, Piedmont Basin, Italy)
P. ascendentiporulosa  (Late Oligocene, Tsuyazaki, Japan)
P. atlantica  - Synonym of P. nanodes
P. attenuatifolia  (Volhynian, Krivodol Formation, Bulgaria)
P. aucubaefolia  (Oligocene-Miocene, Europe)
P. aviiformis  (Piacenzian, Klärbecken Flora, Germany)
P. axelrodi  (Eocene, Kushtaka Formation, Alaska) 
P. barneti  (Middle Miocene, Columbia River Basalts, USA)
P. calophylla
P. calvertensis
P. careyhurstia
P. cathybrownae  (Ypresian, Klondike Mountain Formation, USA)
P. cerasiformis
P. chaneyi  (Oligocene, Creede Formation, USA) 
P. coloradensis
P. corrugis
P. coveus
P. crassa  (Middle Pliocene, Saugbagger-Flora, Germany)
P. creedensis   (Oligocene, Creede Formation, USA)
P. cretacea
P. cylindrica  (Middle Pliocene, Saugbagger-Flora, Germany)

Fossil D-F

P. dakotensis  (Eocene, Fort Union Formation, USA)
P. daphnes  - synonym of P. daphnogene
P. daphnogene  (Miocene, Radoboj, Croatia)
P. denverensis  (Cretaceous, Dawson formation, Colorado)
P. deperdita  (Late Peleocene, Menat Formation, France)
P. druidum  -syn P. eocenica
P. dura
P. echinata  (Middle Pliocene, Saugbagger-Flora, Germany)
P. eleanorae
P. endoana
P. ettingshausenii  - synonym of P. crassa
P. florinii
P. fragilis
P. franklinensis

Fossil G-I

P. girardii  (Middle Pliocene, Saugbagger-Flora, France)
P. grandifolia
P. gummosa  (Eocene, Yellowstone Formation, USA)
P. hanhardtii  (Miocene?, Öhningen, Switzerland)
P. harneyensis
P. hartungi  (Eocene, Svetlogorsk, Kaliningrad Oblast)
P. herbstii  (Middle Pliocene, Saugbagger-Flora, Germany)
P. hirsutipetala
P. ishidae
P. ishidai
P. iwatense  (Middle Miocene, Japan)

Fossil J-L

P. juglandiformis
P. kenaica
P. kryshtofovichii
P. kunmingensis
P. laeta
P. langsdorfii  (Early Oligocene-Middle Miocene, Europe)
P. leporimontana
P. lyoniifolia

Fossil M-O

P. maclearnii
P. marchica
P. masoni
P. masonii
P. matsumaensis
P. maxima
P. mclearni
P. merriami
P. microdonta
P. micropyrenula  (mid-late Oligocene, Rixhöft, Poland)
P. microserrata
P. miobrachypoda
P. miodavidiana
P. mohikana
P. moragensis
P. moselensis
P. nabortensis  (late Eocene, Wilcox Group, USA)
P. nanodes  (Miocene-Pliocene, Europe)
P. nathorstii
P. nerchauensis
P. nevadensis
P. obtusa  - synonym of P. crassa
P. odessana
P. okutsui
P. olsonii  (Middle Eocene, Clarno Formation, USA) 
P. olympica  (Miocene?, "Bohemia")
P. ornata  - synonym of P. crassa

Fossil P-R

P. palaeocerasus  (Middle Miocene, Steiermark, Austria)
P. palaeozippeliana   (Late Oligocene, Tsuyazaki, Japan)
P. paradisiaca
P. parlatorei
P. parvicarpa
P. parvula  (Middle Pliocene, Saugbagger-Flora, Germany)
P. pereger
P. perita
P. petrosperma
P. pliovenosa
P. polyporulosa  (Late Oligocene, Tsuyazaki, Japan)
P. praecommunis
P. preandersonii
P. prefasciculata
P. prefremontii
P. prinoides
P. prisca  -syn P. eocenica
P. pristina
P. protossiori
P. pyrifolia
P. rodgersae  (Middle Miocene, Columbia River Basalts, USA)
P. rubeshibensis
P. rugosa
P. russana  (Pliocene?, Hannau, Germany)
P. rustii

Fossil S-U

P. sambucifolia
P. scharfii
P. schlechtendalii
P. scottii  (Eocene, Greenland)
P.? staratschini  (Eocene?, Spitzbergen)
P. stewarti  (Ypresian, Green River Formation, USA)
P. stipitata  (Pliocene, Limburg, Netherlands)
P. subserotina
P. tanaii
P. tenerirugosa
P. tenuiputamenta  (Pliocene, Limburg, Netherlands)
P. tenuis  - synonym of P. crassa
P. terrae-albae
P. tertiaria
P. treasheri
P. tufacea
P. turlockensis
P. uviporulosa  (Late Oligocene, Tsuyazaki, Japan)

Fossil V-Z

P. variabilis  (Eocene, Cook Inlet, USA)
P. weinsteinii  (Middle Eocene, Clarno Formation, USA)
P. wadiai  (Middle Miocene, Kargil Formation, India)
P. wutuensis  (Early Eocene, Wutu Formation, China)
P. zeuschneri

Reclassified Fossil species
P. askenasyi  (Piacenzian, Klärbecken Flora, Germany) -Synonym of Carya moenana  
P. aspensis  (Albian, Aspen Shale, USA) - Considered an incertae sedis angiosperm
P. bilinica  (Eocene -Early Oligocene, Europe) -Synonym of Iodes bilinica  (including Palaeohosiea suleticensis ) 
P. denticulata  (Middle Miocene, Vrsovice, Czech Republic) -Synonym in part of Alnus gaudinii (foliage), and fruits considered Carpolithes sp.
P. eocenica considered likely an Icacinaceae fruit
P. euri  (Miocene, Parschlug coal basin, Austria) -Synonym of Cedrelospermum ulmifolium 
P. theodisca  (Miocene, Parschlug coal basin, Austria) -Synonym of Quercus mediterranea

References

Prunus